Jaroslav Šedivec (born 16 February 1981) is a retired Czech footballer.

Career
Born in Plzeň, in the modern border of the Czech Republic, Šedivec started his professional career in the local side of Plzeň. He arrived Italy in 2002 and played for several Serie B clubs. in 2007 he was signed by  Triestina in co-ownership deal for €700,000 in 3-year contract. In June 2008 the club signed him outright for another €100,000.

He was the member of Czech Republic U20 team at 2001 FIFA World Youth Championship.

References

External links
 
 Tuttocalciatori.net
 Gazzetta.it

1981 births
Living people
Czech footballers
Czech Republic youth international footballers
Czech Republic under-21 international footballers
Czech expatriate footballers
Czech First League players
Serie B players
Serie C players
FC Viktoria Plzeň players
Catania S.S.D. players
A.C. Perugia Calcio players
F.C. Crotone players
U.S. Triestina Calcio 1918 players
Mantova 1911 players
U.S. Salernitana 1919 players
FeralpiSalò players
Pol. Maccarese Giada players
Czech expatriate sportspeople in Italy
Expatriate footballers in Italy
Association football forwards
Sportspeople from Plzeň